Charith Tissera (born 7 November 1979) is a Sri Lankan former cricketer. He played in 67 first-class and 34 List A matches between 2000/01 and 2012/13. He made his Twenty20 debut on 17 August 2004, for Sri Lanka Air Force Sports Club in the 2004 SLC Twenty20 Tournament.

References

External links
 

1979 births
Living people
Sri Lankan cricketers
Kurunegala Youth Cricket Club cricketers
Sri Lanka Air Force Sports Club cricketers
Place of birth missing (living people)